The Bougainville crow (Corvus meeki) is a species of bird in the crow family, Corvidae.

It is found in on the island of Bougainville in Papua New Guinea and the neighbouring Shortland Islands in the Solomon Islands. Within its range it is the only species of crow.

The Bougainville crow is a heavy crow, 41 cm long, with all black plumage and a massive black bill.

Its natural habitats are subtropical or tropical moist lowland forest and subtropical or tropical moist montane forest up to 1600 m. It is a common species on Bougainville, but it might be threatened in the future by habitat loss caused by logging.

References

Bougainville crow
Birds of Bougainville Island
Bougainville crow
Taxonomy articles created by Polbot